is a Japanese photographer.

Ishikawa was stationed in Saigon and covered the Vietnam War as a photojournalist from 1964 to 1968.  He worked as a staff photographer for Asahi Shimbun from 1969 to 1984. After 1984 he worked as a freelance photographer. After 1984, Ishikawa continued to photograph in conflict zones around the world but also is known for photographs of daily life, portraits, and Ryukyu Dance.

In 1998, Ishikawa donated about 250 photographs with a focus on the Vietnam War to become part of a permanent exhibition at the Vietnam War Remnants Museum in Ho Chi Minh City.  Ishikawa donated about 270 photographs to the Okinawa City "Material Culture after World War II" exhibition room to become a permanent exhibition.

Books
 Forefront of Vietnam, 1967, Yomiuri Shimbun
 This is the Vietnam War (Photograph Book), 1967, Yomiuri Shimbun
 The Vietnam War and the People, 1971, Asahi Shinbunsha
 Photo Reportage. North Vietnam, 1973, Asahi Shinbunsha
 Chien Tranh Giai Phong Viet Nam, 1977
 War and Man: Photo Document Vietnam, 1989, Sowa Shuppan

Exhibitions
 "War, Soldiers, and People" (1970) 
 "North Vietnam" (1973) 
 "South Yemen" (1978) 
 "People and Angkor in Cambodia" (1981) 
 "Ryukyu Dance" (1983) 
 "North Korea" (1984) 
 "Age of Discovery" (1987) 
 "One Year of Fukae-Fugen" (1994) 
 "Illusion of Venice" (1994) 
 "35 Years Reporting War and Peace in Vietnam" (1998) 
 "War and American Bases in Okinawa" (2000)
 "30-year Return of Okinawa" (2002) 
 "65-year-old challenge: Walking Journey across Japan" (2004)　
 "Smile in the World" (2007) 
 "Place over Shikoku Eighty-eight" (2009)

Awards
 Photographic Society of Japan award year (1973)
 Press Photographers Association Awards Japan Magazine (1982, 1983)
 Special Award Japan Congress of Journalists (JCJ) (1990)
 Award / Sweden Prize civic culture Ichikawa (1997)
 Business Achievement Award from the Vietnamese government of Culture and Communication (2005)

References

External links
 Bunyo Ishikawa official web site
 Journey on Foot Across Japan - photo library

Japanese photojournalists
War photographers
Photography in Vietnam
1938 births
Living people